Rolf Danielsen (19 October 1922 – 25 April 2002) was a Norwegian educator, author and historian.

He was born in Hammerfest in Finnmark, Norway.  He was awarded his cand.philol. from the University of Oslo (1950). Danielsen subsequently worked at the University of Oslo (1950-1951) and University of Gothenburg (1963-1964). He was a professor of modern history at the University of Bergen from 1968 to 1991.

His thesis was a study on the Parliament of Norway. He has written volume four of the History of Trondheim. He was a board member of The Research Council of Norway (Norges almenvitenskapelige forskningsråd) from 1973 to 1975.

References

1922 births
2002 deaths
People from Hammerfest
University of Oslo alumni
20th-century Norwegian historians
Academic staff of the University of Bergen